London City Lionesses is a professional women's association football club based in Dartford, England. The team competes in the Women's Championship, the second tier of English women's football. The club was founded in May 2019, as an independent breakaway club from Millwall Lionesses.

History
On 13 May 2019, a statement was released by Millwall F.C. announcing that the board of directors and senior management at the team's official women's affiliate, Millwall Lionesses, had declared their intentions to split from the club, becoming an independent entity and operating under a new name. The breakaway was already agreed in principle by the FA. The transfer of Millwall's Championship licence was officially approved by the FA on 29 June 2019. After only six league games, manager Chris Phillips was sacked with the team sitting fourth in the Championship.

Players

Current squad
.

Former players

Club staff

|}

Managerial history
Information correct as of 1 May 2022. Only competitive matches are counted.

Seasons

References

External links
 

 
2019 establishments in England
Association football clubs established in 2019
Women's Championship (England) teams
Women's football clubs in England
Women's football clubs in London